Haplotrematidae is a taxonomic family of predatory air-breathing land snails, terrestrial pulmonate gastropod mollusks in the superfamily Haplotrematoidea.

Distribution
These are North American land snails. They occur from Alaska, through British Columbia, and as far south as northern Mexico, but they are predominantly snails of the eastern and western United States.

Shell description
Their shells vary in size from small (7 mm in diameter, or about 0.3 inches) to medium (32 mm, about 1.3 inches), usually with a low, flattened spire, a very wide umbilicus, and usually with the upper lip margin (at the aperture) curving downwards or straightened.

Anatomy
They have a number of anatomical peculiarities.

The structure of the radula of these snails (their "teeth") is unusual. Essentially, haplotrematids have fewer cusps than most snails, but they are considerably elongated, suitable for the predatory life they follow. Members of this family have been given the common name "lancetooth" snails, presumably based on this last anatomical characteristic. Their sole food source consists, as far as is known, of other terrestrial mollusks.

In this family, the number of haploid chromosomes lies between 26 and 30 (according to the values in this table).

Genera
Genera within the family Haplotrematidae include:
 Subfamily Austroselenitinae H. B. Baker, 1941
 Austroselenites Kobelt, 1905
 Zophos Gude, 1911
Subfamily Haplotrematinae H. B. Baker, 1925
 Ancomena H. B. Baker, 1931
 Ancotrema H. B. Baker, 1931
 Greggiella H. B. Baker, 1941
 Haplotrema Ancey, 1881
Synonyms
 Moerchia E. von Martens, 1860: synonym of Zophos Gude, 1911 (invalid: junior homonym of Moerchia A. Adams, 1860 [published earlier])
 Selenites P. Fischer, 1878: synonym of Zophos Gude, 1911
 Proselenites Thiele, 1927: synonym of Haplotrema (Geomene) Pilsbry, 1927 represented as Haplotrema Ancey, 1881

References

 Bouchet P., Rocroi J.P., Hausdorf B., Kaim A., Kano Y., Nützel A., Parkhaev P., Schrödl M. & Strong E.E. (2017). Revised classification, nomenclator and typification of gastropod and monoplacophoran families. Malacologia. 61(1-2): 1-526

External links